Martin O'Brien (16 October 1875 – 17 November 1946) was an Australian rules footballer who played with St Kilda in the Victorian Football League (VFL).

Notes

External links 

1875 births
1946 deaths
Australian rules footballers from Victoria (Australia)
St Kilda Football Club players